Eleebana is a suburb of the City of Lake Macquarie in New South Wales, Australia,  from Newcastle's central business district along the eastern shoreline of Lake Macquarie.

History 
Eleebana remained unsettled until it became part of the Newcastle/Lake Macquarie urban sprawl, due to its unsuitability for agriculture. This suburb lay at the northern boundary of Threlkeld's original Bahtahbah grant, and was just south of Warner's 1280 acres. Portion 40 of 158 acres, (Kahibah Parish) was granted to G.L. Yorston in 1860, who was married to Warner's daughter; Portion 41 of 167 acres to J.B. Watt; and Portion 42 of 194 acres to Thomas Adam.

The land was poor and steep and unsuitable for agriculture and remained unsettled. However, as was usual in those times, Henry Halloran, in the 1920s and 30s, sold boatshed leases on the waterfront fronting Croudace Bay and sheds were built there and occupied during the summer. The council had difficulty in negotiating their removal after World War 1. Their sites were eventually added to Thomas H. Halton Park, Croudace Bay.

The suburbanization took place with new subdivisions mainly to the north. In 1976 Hooker-Rex Estates announced its plans to develop 240 acres around Glad Gunson Drive, which included parts of the old Croft Estate, Portion 41 and Portion 40. The first three stages of development originally contained 230 allotments, with a further 470 developed in the late 1970s/early 1980s.

In 1947 electricity came to the area and in 1948 reticulated waster was connected. The first school opened in 1955 (Eleebana Public). In 1977 sewerage was connected.

References

External links
 History of Eleebana (Lake Macquarie City Library)

Suburbs of Lake Macquarie